The 1958 Ice Hockey World Championships were held between February 28 and March 9, 1958, in Oslo, Norway at the Jordal Amfi arena. The Whitby Dunlops represented Canada, winning the World Championship for the 17th time. The Soviets lost the final game to the Canadians 4–2, settling for both silver and their fourth European Championship. Scoring leader Connie Broden is the only player to win the Stanley Cup and the World Championship in the same year, having played on the Montreal Canadiens' championship team.

Standings

Final round

European Championship medal table

Tournament awards
 Best players selected by the directorate:
 Best Goaltender:  Vladimír Nadrchal
Best Defenceman:  Ivan Tregubov
Best Forward:  Charlie Burns

Citations

References
Championnat du monde 1958 (Archived 2009-05-04) sur hockeyarchives.info 

IIHF Men's World Ice Hockey Championships
World Championships
1958
Ice Hockey World Championships
Ice Hockey World Championships
International sports competitions in Oslo
Ice Hockey World Championships, 1958